Mazerolles is a commune in the Vienne department in the Nouvelle-Aquitaine region in western France.

Location 

Located on the Vienne river which separates Mazerolles and Lussac-les-Châteaux, the village is 35 km south-east of Poitiers. It is made up of the village, and the localities "le Pont" and "Loubressac". It is located on the RN147 (axis Angers - Limoges), close to another major communication Highway A10 between Poitiers and Vivonne).

The sub-prefecture, Montmorillon is 14 km, Le Blanc (sub-prefecture of the Indre department  is 40 km distant. Bellac in the Haute-Vienne department is 45 km. Large towns: Poitiers 35 km, Châtellerault 50 km, Limoges 90 km.

The town is close to the Parc naturel régional de la Brenne.

History

Along the border of the river Vienne, a cenotaph of constable John Chandos was erected shortly after his death by the English authorities to commemorate the spot where he was killed by the spear of French knight Guillaume Boitel. The cenotaph is still maintained and visible in a garden along the street Jean Chandos at a place called "Les Aubeniaux" . At the end of the 19th century, the local society of history moved it from the banks of the Vienne because of recurrent flooding of this river.

See also
Communes of the Vienne department

References

Communes of Vienne